Mamaison Hotels & Residences is a collection of 9 midscale to upscale hotels and residences.  The properties are located in major cities in The Czech Republic, Hungary, Poland, Slovakia and Russia.

The hotels are branded into three categories:  Boutique Hotels, Business & Conference Hotels and All-Suites Residence Hotels.

The parent company is CPI Hotels, a.s.

History

Founded in 1991 by Jean-Francois Ott, Ott bought his first hotel, the Mamaison Hotel Andrassy in Budapest, in 1999.  Residence Masaryk was also purchased and opened in 1999, as an extended-stay hotel.

 In 2001, purchased the Pachtuv Palace in Prague, and the Imperial Hotel in Ostrava (both in The Czech Republic).  The Andrassy Hotel in Budapest opened in 2001.
 In 2002, ORCO opened some Mamaison residences, and the Riverside Hotel in Prague.  ORCO also purchased Le Regina in Warsaw in 2002.
 In 2003, Mamaison took over the operation of Hotel Imperial in Ostrava, from Horizon.  Horizon had been operating the hotel under a management contract.
 In 2004, the Pachtuv Palace opened in Prague, after extensive renovations.  Le Regina (Warsaw) and Residence Sulekova (Bratislava) also opened in 2004.
 In 2005, Mamaison began a new construction of Moscow's first all-suite hotel, Mamaison All-Suites Spa Hotel Pokrovka.  The hotel opened on September 25, 2007.

References

External links 
Mamaison website

Hotel chains
Hotels in the Czech Republic
Hotels established in 1991